Deseado River is a river in the Argentine province of Santa Cruz. The name Deseado comes from the English Desire, the name of one of the two ships commanded by John Davis during the Thomas Cavendish expedition of 1592.

The source of the river is located as the Fénix River some kilometers north of the Buenos Aires Lake in the northwestern part of the province at the Andes range. Originally, if then flowed into the lake (and the via Rio Baker into the Pacific).  In 1898, a canal was built that turned it into today's Rio Deseado, flowing for  before reaching the Atlantic Coast. On its way southeast, its water is tapped for irrigation. Its tributaries include the Pinturas River.

The river sometimes disappears under the arid terrain, to re-emerge before reaching Puerto Deseado on Santa Cruz's coastline, where it produces a deep-water natural port. The outlet of the river has become submerged and inundated by sea water, forming an estuary. In 1977, this was set aside as a nature reserve, the Reserva Natural Ría Deseado.

References

Rivers of Santa Cruz Province, Argentina
Rivers of Argentina